was a Japanese poet and painter. He was a recipient of the Yomiuri Prize.

Biography
Mitsuharu Kaneko was born in Tsushima, Aichi and attended the private Catholic school Gyosei Gakuen in Tokyo.  He published his first poetry collection Akatsuchi no Ie (Red Clay House) in 1919.  He was known as an anti-establishment figure, and during the Second World War, he deliberately made his son ill, so he would not be drafted.  As well as publishing several volumes of poetry, he was also known for his autobiographical works. In 1954, he received the 5th Yomiuri Prize.

Selected bibliography

Poetry
Kohro (The Censor), private edition, Tokyo, 1916 
Sekido no ie (The House of Red Clay), private edition, Tokyo, 1919
Koganemushi (Japanese Beetle), Shinchosha, Tokyo, 1923
Dai-furan shoh (Ode to Great Putrefaction), unpublished, 1923
Mizu no ruroh (Wanderings of Water), Shinchosha, Tokyo, 1926
Fuka shizumu (The Shark Sinks), co-authored with Mori Michiyo, Shinchosha, Tokyo, 1927
Same (Sharks), Jinminsha, Tokyo, 1937
Rakkasan (Parachute), Nihon mirai-ha hakkosho, Tokyo, 1948
Ga (Moth), Hokutoshoin, Tokyo, 1948
Onna-tachi e no eregii (Elegies to Women), Sogensha, Tokyo, 1949
Oni no ko no uta (Songs of a Devil’s Child), Jyuhjiya Shoten, Tokyo, 1949
Ningen no higeki (Human Tragedy), Sogensha, Tokyo, 1952
Hijoh (Merciless), Shinchosha, Tokyo, 1955
Collected Poems (5 volumes), Shoshi Yuriika/Shoushinsha, Tokyo, 1960–1971
He no yoh na uta (Songs Like a Fart), Schichosha, Tokyo, 1962 
IL, Keisoshobo, Tokyo, 1965
Wakaba no uta (Songs of Young Leaves), Keisoshobo, Tokyo, 1967
Complete Poems, Chikumashobo, Tokyo, 1967
Aijyo 69 (Love 69), Chikumashobo, Tokyo, 1968
Hana to akibin (Flowers and Empty Bottles), Seigashobo, Tokyo, 1973

Essays
Marei Ran’in Kikoh (Malay and Dutch East Indies Travelogue), 1940
Shijin (Poet), Heibonsha, Tokyo, 1957, an autobiography
Dokuro-hai (Skull Cup), Chuoh kohron sha, Tokyo, 1971
Nemure pari (Go to Sleep, Paris), Chuo kohron sha, Tokyo, 1973
Nishi higashi (West and East), Chuoh kohron sha, Tokyo, 1974

Works in English
Opposition in 99 Poems in Translation, New York, Grove Press, 1994

References

External links
Poetry International Rotterdam

1895 births
1975 deaths
People from Tsushima, Aichi
Artists from Aichi Prefecture
20th-century Japanese poets
Yomiuri Prize winners
Writers from Aichi Prefecture